"Repetition" is a 1989 ballad and single by Information Society. The song peaked at number 76 in the Billboard Hot 100.

The music video, shot in black and white, shows the band between building ruins and old things, that complete the sad line of the lyrics.

Tracks

 7" Single

 12" Single

 CD Single

Charts

References

1980s ballads
1988 songs
1989 singles
Information Society (band) songs
Music videos directed by Mark Pellington
Tommy Boy Records singles